Jared Gooden (born December 5, 1993) is an American mixed martial artist who competes in the Welterweight division of the Ultimate Fighting Championship. A professional mixed martial artist since 2015, Gooden has also competed for Legacy Fighting Alliance and Titan Fighting Championships.

Background
When Jared was 16 years old, he came across Matt Hughes and BJ Penn while flipping channels at his dad's house. He fell in love with the sport after watching the fight. A few year later, Jared saw a MMA fight poster come up on his Facebook feed and emailed the address that appeared on it. He would get a reply from the promoter, David Oblas, asking for his gym, length of training time and MMA record, all of which Jared did not have. David then sent him to a nearby gym run by Phillipe Gentry instead. He walked into Coach Phillipe’s gym and started training at 17 years old on June 2nd of 2011.

Mixed martial arts career

Early career
Gooden made his MMA debut at NFC 76, where he submitted Bobby Tucker via rear-naked choke in the second round. Gooden would win his next 5 bouts, before losing to Dave Vitkay at NFC 86 for the NFC Welterweight Championship via unanimous decision. Rebounding with a win via unanimous decision at NFC 89 against Micah Miller, he would lose to Julien Williams at NFC 94 via unanimous decision. Winning his next 7 bouts, culminating  his one and only outing with Legacy Fighting Alliance at LFA 59, where he faced Steven Newell and went on to defeat him via unanimous decision. He would then fight at Titan FC 53: Bad Blood, where he faced Michael Graves for the interim Titan FC Welterweight Championship, however he lost the bout via unanimous decision. After defeating Will Santiago Jr via TKO in the first round at Jackson Wink Fight Night 5., he would return to Titan FC at Titan FC 55 against Bruno Oliveira, losing again but this time by TKO in the first round. He would win the next three bouts; tapping out Marcel Stamps in the second round via guillotine at Island Fights 60, Jay Jackson via rear-naked choke in the first at Empire FC 5 and finally Trent McCown via TKO in the 2nd round at Titan FC 62.

Ultimate Fighting Championship
Gooden made his UFC debut against Alan Jouban on November 21, 2020 at UFC 255. He lost the fight via unanimous decision.

Gooden faced Abubakar Nurmagomedov on March 27, 2021 at UFC 260. He lost the fight via unanimous decision.

Gooden, as a replacement for Mounir Lazzez, faced Niklas Stolze on July 30, 2021 at UFC on ESPN: Hall vs. Strickland. He won the fight via knockout in round one.

Gooden faced Randy Brown on October 6, 2021 at UFC Fight Night 194. At the weight-ins, Jared Gooden weighted 174 pounds, three pounds over the limit of non-championship welterweight bouts. The bout proceeded to a catchweight bout. Gooden was fined 20% of his purse and it went to his opponent Randy Brown. He lost the fight via unanimous decision.

On January 12, 2022, it was announced that Gooden's contract was not renewed.

Post-UFC 
Gooden made his first appearance post-release at iKON FC 1 on January 21, 2022 against Aaron Highbaugh for the iKON FC middleweight title. He won the fight via unanimous decision.

Gooden faced Curtis Millender on April 2, 2022 at XMMA 4. He won the bout after dropping Millender in the second round with a leg kick and finishing him with ground and pound.

Gooden faced Impa Kasanganay at XMMA 5 on July 23, 2022. He lost the fight by a first-round TKO stoppage.

Gooden returned in October to face Doug Usher at NFC 150 for the NFC Middleweight Championship, winning the bout in the second round after Usher was unable to continue due to injury.

Gooden faced Demarques Jackson in the Quarter-finals of the Welterweight Grand Prix on February 18, 2023 at United Fight League 1, winning the bout in the second round via TKO stoppage.

Return to UFC 
Gooden stepped in on three days notice to face Carlston Harris, replacing Abubakar Nurmagomedov, on March 11, 2023, at UFC Fight Night 221. At the weigh-ins, Gooden weighed in at 177 pounds, six pounds over the welterweight non-title fight limit. The bout proceeded at catchweight and he was fined 30% of his purse, which went to Harris. He lost the fight via unanimous decision.

Championships and accomplishments

Mixed martial arts
National Fighting Championship
NFC Welterweight Championship (One time)
One successful title defence
NFC Middleweight Championship (One time)

Mixed martial arts record

|-
|Loss
|align=center|22–9
|Carlston Harris
|Decision (unanimous)
|UFC Fight Night: Yan vs. Dvalishvili
|
|align=center|3
|align=center|5:00
|Las Vegas, Nevada, United States
|
|-
|Win
|align=center|22–8
|Demarques Jackson
|TKO (punches)
|United Fight League 1
|
|align=center|2
|align=center|0:50
|Mesa, Arizona, United States
|
|-
|Win
|align=center|21–8
|Doug Usher
|TKO (injury)
|NFC 150
|
|align=center|2
|align=center|4:55
|Atlanta, Georgia, United States
|
|-
|Loss
|align=center|20–8
|Impa Kasanganay
|TKO (punches)
|XMMA 5
|
|align=center|1
|align=center|3:16
|Columbia, South Carolina, United States
|
|-
|Win
|align=center|20–7
|Curtis Millender
| TKO (leg kick and punches)
|XMMA 4
|
|align=center|2
|align=center|0:16
|New Orleans, Louisiana, United States
|
|-
|Win
|align=center|19–7
|Aaron Highbaugh
|Decision (unanimous)
|iKON FC 1
|
|align=center|3
|align=center|5:00
|West Palm Beach, Florida, United States
|
|-
|Loss
|align=center|18–7
|Randy Brown
|Decision (unanimous)
|UFC Fight Night: Dern vs. Rodriguez
|
|align=center|3
|align=center|5:00
|Las Vegas, Nevada, United States
|
|-
|Win
|align=center|18–6
|Niklas Stolze
|KO (punch)
|UFC on ESPN: Hall vs. Strickland
|
|align=center|1
|align=center|1:08
|Las Vegas, Nevada, United States
|
|-
| Loss
| align=center| 17–6
| Abubakar Nurmagomedov
|Decision (unanimous)
|UFC 260
|
|align=center|3
|align=center|5:00
|Las Vegas, Nevada, United States
|
|-
| Loss
| align=center| 17–5
| Alan Jouban
|Decision (unanimous)
|UFC 255
|
|align=center|3
|align=center|5:00
|Las Vegas, Nevada, United States
|
|-
| Win
| align=center|17–4
|Trent McCown
|TKO (punches and elbows)
|Titan FC 62
|
|align=center|2
|align=center|2:31
|Miami, Florida, United States
|
|-
| Win
| align=center|16–4
| Jay Jackson
|Submission (rear-naked choke)
|Empire FC 5
|
|align=center|1
|align=center|1:45
|Biloxi, Mississippi, United States
|
|-
| Win
| align=center|15–4
| Marcel Stamps
|Submission (guillotine choke)
|Island Fights 60
|
|align=center|2
|align=center|2:18
|Columbus, Georgia, United States
|
|-
| Loss
| align=center| 14–4
| Bruno Oliveira
| TKO (punches and knee)
| Titan FC 55
| 
|align=center|1
|align=center|0:53
| Fort Lauderdale, Florida, United States
|
|-
| Win
| align=center| 14–3
| Will Santiago
| TKO (knee and punches)
|JacksonWink Fight Night 5
|
|align=center|1
|align=center|0:28
|Albuquerque, New Mexico, United States
|
|-
| Loss
| align=center| 13–3
| Michael Graves
|Decision (unanimous)
|Titan FC 53: Bad Blood
|
|align=center|5
|align=center|5:00
|Fort Lauderdale, Florida, United States
|
|-
| Win
| align=center|13–2
| Steven Newell
|Decision (unanimous)
| LFA 59
| 
| align=center| 3
| align=center| 5:00
| Phoenix, Arizona, United States
|
|-
| Win
| align=center|12–2
| Cody Wilson
|TKO (superman punch)
|864 Fighting Championship 7
|
|align=center|3
|align=center|0:24
|Greenville, South Carolina, United States
|
|-
| Win
| align=center|11–2
| Ladarious Jackson
| KO (flying knee)
| NFC 108
| 
| align=center|3
| align=center|0:07
|Kennesaw, Georgia, United States
|
|-
| Win
| align=center| 10–2
| Sean Kilgus
| TKO (punches)
| NFC 105
| 
| align=center|1
| align=center|4:59
| Kennesaw, Georgia, United States
| 
|-
| Win
| align=center| 9–2
| Elijah Wynter
| Decision (unanimous)
| NFC 99
|
|align=Center|3
|align=center|5:00
|Atlanta, Georgia, United States
| 
|-
| Win
| align=center| 8–2
| Wesley Golden
|Submission (rear-naked choke)
|NFC 96
|
|align=center|2
|align=center|1:53
|Kennesaw, Georgia, United States
|
|-
| Loss
| align=center| 7–2
| Julien Williams
|Decision (unanimous)
|NFC 94
|
|align=center|3
|align=center|5:00
|Atlanta, Georgia, United States
|
|-
| Win
| align=center|7–1
| Micah Miller
| Decision (unanimous)
| NFC 89
| 
| align=center| 3
| align=center| 5:00
| Atlanta, Georgia, United States
|
|-
| Loss
| align=center| 6–1
| Dave Vitkay
|Decision (unanimous)
|NFC 86
|
|align=center|3
|align=center|5:00
|Atlanta, Georgia, United States
|
|-
| Win
| align=center| 6–0
| Amir Dadovic
| Decision (unanimous)
| NFC 84
|
|align=Center|3
|align=center|5:00
|Atlanta, Georgia, United States
|
|-
| Win
| align=center| 5–0
| Tanner Saraceno
| TKO (punches)
| NFC 83
| 
|align=center|2
|align=center|1:45
| Atlanta, Georgia, United States
| 
|-
| Win
| align=center| 4–0
| Smith Amisial
| Submission (rear-naked choke)
| OCF Fight Night 1
| 
| align=center| 2
| align=center| 2:09
| Fern Park, Florida, United States
| 
|-
| Win
| align=center| 3–0
| Nick Poythress
|TKO (doctor stoppage)
|NFC 80
|
|align=center|3
|align=center|3:10
|Atlanta, Georgia, United States
| 
|-
| Win
| align=center| 2–0
| Brad Taylor
| Submission (armbar)
| Legacy FC 47
| 
| align=center| 3
| align=center| 2:01
| Atlanta, Georgia, United States
|
|-
| Win
| align=center| 1–0
| Bobby Tucker
| Submission (triangle choke)
| NFC 76
| 
| align=center| 2
| align=center| 4:02
| Atlanta, Georgia, United States
|

See also 
 List of male mixed martial artists

References

External links 
  
  

1993 births
Living people
American male mixed martial artists
Welterweight mixed martial artists
Mixed martial artists utilizing Brazilian jiu-jitsu
Ultimate Fighting Championship male fighters
American practitioners of Brazilian jiu-jitsu